At the 2001 Jeux de la Francophonie, the athletics events were held at Terry Fox Stadium in Ottawa, Ontario, Canada between 19 and 23 July 2001. A total of 47 events were contested, of which 24 by male and 23 by female athletes. Included in this were two disability athletics events for wheelchair racers. A total of 23 Games records were broken or equalled in the competition.

The host nation won the most gold medals in the competition—taking eleven golds in a haul of 24 medals— but it was beaten on the total overall medal count by France which won 27 events. Morocco performed particularly well in the middle- and long-distance track events. Newcomer Poland made an impact in its debut, taking nine golds with most of its athletes succeeding in the field events. Among the other nations competing, Romania and Mauritius managed four gold medals each.

The competition attracted higher level performances and participation than in previous editions, in part due to the 2001 World Championships in Athletics which was also held in Canada some two weeks later. Bruny Surin was defeated by Stéphan Buckland in the men's 100 metres. Surin decided not to compete in the 200 metres as a result – a move which attracted criticism as he had reportedly been paid 250,000 Canadian dollars to act as a Games ambassador.

The quality of the host stadium also came in for criticism from those attending the event, which one French official stating that "a poor African country" could have held the event to a better standard. Of the winners in Ottawa, Perdita Felicien, Szymon Ziółkowski, Amy Mbacké Thiam and Nezha Bidouane also went on to become gold medallists in their respective events at the World Championships. A number of other athletes went on to win minor medals on the world stage soon after – Paweł Czapiewski, Dudley Dorival, Monika Pyrek, Françoise Mbango-Etone and Nicoleta Grasu.

Medal summary

Men

Women

Medal table

References

Results
Full results
Medallists. GBR Athletics. Retrieved on 2011-02-09.

External links
Official website 

Jeux de la Francophonie
2001 Jeux de la Francophonie
2001
2001 Jeux de la Francophonie